Golden frog or Gold frog may refer to:

Amphibians
Panamanian golden frog (Atelopus zeteki), a critically endangered toad species in the family Bufonidae endemic to Panama
Brazilian gold frog (Brachycephalus didactylus), a tiny frog in the family Brachycephalidae, endemic to Brazil
Golden frog (Hylarana aurantiaca), a frog in the family Ranidae found in the Western Ghats of India and in Sri Lanka
Eastern golden frog (Pelophylax plancyi), a frog in the family Ranidae found in northeastern China
Golden poison frog (Phyllobates terribilis), a poison dart frog in the family Dendrobatidae endemic to the Pacific coast of Colombia
Golden rocket frog (Anomaloglossus beebei), a frog in the family Aromobatidae, endemic to Kaieteur National Park in Guyana
Supatá golden frog, (Ranitomeya sp. nov. “Supatáe”), a species of poison dart frog endemic to Colombia

Other uses
 Golden Frog, an award for best cinematography from Camerimage
 "The Golden Frog", a short story in Señor Saint by Leslie Charteris
 "The Golden Frog", an episode of The Saint

See also
Golden coquí (Eleutherodactylus jasperi), a rare and possibly extinct frog in the family Eleutherodactylidae from Puerto Rico
Golden mantella (Mantella aurantiaca), a small terrestrial frog in the family Mantellidae native to Madagascar
Golden toad (Bufo periglenes), a small toad in the family Bufonidae from Costa Rica
Frog (disambiguation)

Animal common name disambiguation pages